The ballata (plural: ballate) is an Italian poetic and musical form in use from the late 13th to the 15th century. It has the musicapenim AbbaA, with the first and last stanzas having the same texts.  It is thus most similar to the French musical 'forme fixe' virelai (and not the ballade as the name might otherwise suggest).  The first and last "A" is called a ripresa, the "b" lines are piedi (feet), while the fourth line is called a "volta".  Longer ballate may be found in the form AbbaAbbaA, etc. 
Unlike the virelai, the two "b" lines usually have exactly the same music and only in later ballate pick up the (formerly distinctly French) first and second (open and close) endings.  The term comes from the verb ballare, to dance, and the form certainly began as dance music.

The ballata was one of the most prominent secular musical forms during the trecento, the period often known as the Italian ars nova.  Ballate are sung at the end of each day of Boccaccio's Decameron (only one musical setting of these poems, by Lorenzo da Firenze, survives).  Early ballate, such as those found in the Rossi Codex are monophonic.  Later, ballate are found for two or three voices.  The most notable composer of ballate is Francesco Landini, who composed in the second half of the 14th century.  Other composers of ballata include Andrea da Firenze, a contemporary of Francesco Landini, as well as Bartolino da Padova, Johannes Ciconia, Prepositus Brixiensis and Zacara da Teramo.  In the 15th century both Arnold de Lantins and Guillaume Dufay wrote ballate; they were among the last to do so.

See also
 Ballo

References

Medieval music genres
Italian music history
Western medieval lyric forms